Charlie Sherer (28 July 1903 – 13 July 1967) was an  Australian rules footballer who played with Hawthorn in the Victorian Football League (VFL).

Notes

External links 

1903 births
1967 deaths
Australian rules footballers from Victoria (Australia)
Hawthorn Football Club players